The Yagachi River is a river in Karnataka, India. It arises in the Western Ghats near the city of Chickmagaluru, flows through Belur Taluka, Hassan District, where it becomes a tributary of the Hemavati River, which it enters near Gorur. It has a small tributary called Votehole or Watehole. Votehole dam is built on the stream (1.36TMCft) near Rajanahalli.

The Yagachi dam was constructed in the year 2001. The reservoir is situated at an elevation of 965 meters above MSL. The length of the Yagachi dam is 1280 meters. The maximum height above the foundation of the reservoir is 26.237 meters.

Capture water sports Center located near Yagachi River. Perfect spot for water games. Jet Ski, Speed Boat Ride, Banana Boat, Bumper Ride, Kayaking, Cruise Boat are available here.near Belur city.

Yagachi dam has a Gross Storage Capacity of 3.17 Tmcft. On 10 August 2019, the dam recorded a highest outflow of about 25000 cusecs, due to torrential rains in Chikkamagaluru Taluk. Its catchment area extends from south of Mullayyanagiri (Bababudan Range) to Gorur Dam.

Yagachi, along with Votehole serves the purpose of irrigation and drinking water for the cities of Belur, Chikkamagaluru, Arsikere and Hassan.

Gallery

Notes

Rivers of Karnataka
Geography of Chikkamagaluru district
Geography of Hassan district
Rivers of India